Rose Mary Hatem Bonsack (October 24, 1933 – September 27, 2020) was an American politician and physician who represented the 34th district in the Maryland House of Delegates from 1991 to 1999.

Early life
Rose Mary Hatem was born on October 24, 1933, in Havre de Grace, Maryland, to Nasma and Joseph Hatem. She was a third generation Lebanese American.

She graduated from Washington College with a Bachelor of Science degree, cum laude in 1955. She attended the University of Maryland Medical School and in 1960, she received her M.D. from the Medical College of Pennsylvania.

Career
She worked as a physician. She worked as a member of a member of the medical and surgical faculty of the state of Maryland from 1961 to 2020. She was president of the Maryland Academy of Family Physicians, serving from 1989 until 1990.

Hatem Bonsack served in the Maryland House of Delegates, representing District 34, from 1991 to 1999. She was a member of the Environmental Matters Committee from 1991 until 1994, and the Joint Committee on Health Care Delivery and Financing from 1993 until 1999. She was also Vice-Chair of the Rules and Executive Nominations Committee from 1994 until 1999. Finally, she was chair of the Harford County Delegation in 1994 and again from 1998 until 1999.

Personal life
She married James Bonsack. They had two daughters and three sons.

She died on September 27, 2020, in Havre de Grace, Maryland at age 86. She was buried at Mt. Erin Cemetery in Havre de Grace.

Election results
1994 Race for Maryland House of Delegates – District 34
Voters choose three:
{| class="wikitable"
|-
!Name
!Votes
!Percent
!Outcome
|-
|- 
|Nancy Jacobs, Rep.
|18,091
|  20%
|   Won
|-
|- 
|Rose Mary Hatem Bonsack, Dem.
|17,762
|  20%
|   Won
|-
|- 
|Mary Louise Preis, Dem.
|17,380
|  19%
|   Won
|-
|- 
|B. Daniel Riley, Dem.
|13,891
|  15%
|   Lost
|-
|- 
|Scott Williams, Rep.
|12,362
|  14%
|   Lost
|-
|- 
|Kenneth A. Thompson, Rep.
|10,576
|  12%
|   Lost
|}

1990 Race for Maryland House of Delegates – District 34 - Harford County
Voters to choose three:
{| class="wikitable"
!Name
!Votes
!Percent
!Outcome
|-
|- 
|Rose Mary Hatem Bonsack, Dem.
|13,373
|  19%
|   Won
|-
|-
|Mary Louise Preis, Dem.
|13,045
|  19%
|   Won
|-
|- 
|David R. Craig, Rep.
|12,031
|  18%
|   Won
|-
|- 
|William H. Cox Jr., Dem.
|10,296
|  15%
|   Lost
|-
|- 
|David M. Meadows, Rep.
|10,069
|  15%
|   Lost
|-
|- 
|Cecil W. Wood, Rep.
|9,840
|  14%
|   Lost
|}

External links
 http://www.msa.md.gov/msa/mdmanual/06hse/former/html/msa12189.html
 http://www.ourcampaigns.com/CandidateDetail.html?CandidateID=20273

References

1933 births
2020 deaths
People from Havre de Grace, Maryland
Washington College alumni
Hahnemann Medical College alumni 
Democratic Party members of the Maryland House of Delegates
Women state legislators in Maryland
21st-century American women
Physicians from Maryland
American politicians of Lebanese descent